"Rock Lobster" is a song written by Fred Schneider and Ricky Wilson, two members of the B-52's. It was twice recorded and released as a single, first by DB Records as their debut release in April 1978, and again the following year for the band's self-titled debut album on Warner Bros. Records. 

The song became one of their signature tunes and launched the band's career. "Rock Lobster" was well-received by critics, and went on to place at No. 147 on Rolling Stone's 500 Greatest Songs of All Time list in December 2004.

Composition and themes

The original DB Records single version has a duration of 4:37, and is faster in tempo and more "raw" than the 1979 single version, basically due to lower sound quality and the absence of a bassline. It has the same lyrics as the re-recorded version, but with more lines during the sequence that lists marine animals. The 1979 version is edited down from the album version, which lasts about seven minutes and contains an additional verse.

According to a "Behind the Vinyl" video with B-52's singer Fred Schneider for CHBM-FM, the song was mostly inspired by a nightclub in Atlanta named 2001, where, instead of having a light show, the club featured a slide show with pictures of puppies, babies, and lobsters on a grill.

The song's lyrics describe a beach party while mentioning both real and imagined marine animals ("There goes a dogfish, chased by a catfish, in flew a sea robin, watch out for that piranha, there goes a narwhal, here comes a bikini whale!"), with absurd noises accompanying each, provided by Kate Pierson on the higher-pitched sounds and Cindy Wilson the lower-pitched ones. The chorus features Pierson and Wilson singing a long "ahhh" at an ascending pitch, followed by Schneider exclaiming the phrase "rock lobster!".

"Rock Lobster" is written in the key of C minor (with a raised fourth in the chorus) and is in common time. Instruments used in the music include a baritone-tuned surf-style Mosrite electric guitar, a Farfisa Combo Compact organ, and drums. Pierson played the song's bassline on a Korg SB-100 synthesizer in the 1979 version.

Reception
Stephen Thomas Erlewine of AllMusic called the song "incredibly infectious" and "memorable". Cash Box called it a "silly yet utterly enjoyable affair." Record World said that "The dance-oriented -rock band from Georgia has already charmed critics and cults. This quirky, intriguing cut from their self-titled LP should do the same for AOR-pop fans."

Chart performance
The version of "Rock Lobster" released by Warner Bros. was the band's first single to appear on the Billboard Hot 100, where it reached No. 56. A major hit in Canada, the single went all the way to No. 1 in the RPM national chart. "Rock Lobster" reached #37 on the UK Singles Chart in August 1979; when reissued as a double A-side with "Planet Claire" in 1986, it peaked at No. 12. In Australia, it peaked at No. 3 in 1980.

Weekly charts

Year-end charts

In popular culture
On January 26, 1980, the band appeared on Saturday Night Live, where they performed "Rock Lobster" and "Dance This Mess Around".

In the spring of 1980 John Lennon, whose post-Beatles music career had been on hiatus for nearly five years while focusing on raising his son Sean, was prompted to record again after hearing "Rock Lobster". According to Lennon, "it sounds just like Ono's music, so I said to meself, 'it's time to get out the old axe and wake the wife up!'" His return to the studio led to the release of 1980's Double Fantasy, which would be his final album. At a 2002 B-52's concert in New York, Ono joined the band on stage for the performance of this song.

The song appears in the Family Guy episodes "The Cleveland–Loretta Quagmire" (in which Peter plays it on guitar), and "Screams of Silence: The Story of Brenda Q" (as "Iraq Lobster"). It also appears in the 2008 movie The Pirates Who Don't Do Anything: A VeggieTales Movie (as "Rock Monster").

Early Commodore Amiga 500 units had "B52/ROCK LOBSTER" etched on the main circuit board.

The song is playable in the video games Donkey Konga, Rock Band 3, and Just Dance 4.

Panic! at the Disco sampled the song's guitar riff for their song "Don't Threaten Me with a Good Time" from their fifth studio album Death of a Bachelor (2016).

In 1988, Paul Sadoff named his Bicycle Frame business Rock Lobster Cycles after the song.

Rock Lobster was featured as part of Optus's "It starts with yes" campaign in the early 2020s.

In 1998, Magic: the Gathering'''s self parody set Unglued'', an artifact creature named Rock Lobster can be played. Due to the card's mechanics referencing Rock Paper Scissors it prevents a card named Scissors Lizard from attacking of blocking. Another card in the set, Paper Tiger prevents Rock Lobster from doing the same. The cards would be reprinted in 2020 with Unsanctioned.

See also
List of number-one singles of 1980 (Canada)

References

External links

1978 debut singles
1978 songs
1979 singles
1980 singles
The B-52's songs
Fictional lobsters and crayfish
Novelty songs
Warner Records singles
RPM Top Singles number-one singles
Songs about invertebrates
Songs written by Fred Schneider